Doris Davenport, also known as Doris Jordan (January 1, 1917 – June 18, 1980) was an American actress in movies of the 1930s and early 1940s.

Early years 
Davenport was born in Moline, Illinois, and lived in Davenport, Iowa, before she and her mother moved to Los Angeles, California. She wanted to be an actress when she was five years old, and her parents supported that desire by providing voice training and classes in drama.

Career 
Davenport's first film was Kid Millions (1934). After that, however, she said, "It looked as if my career had begun and ended all at once."

From 1934 to 1939, she appeared in five films and worked in New York City as a fashion model between films.  When she auditioned under the screen name Doris Jordan for the role of Scarlett O'Hara for Gone with the Wind, she did well enough to become one of the finalists for the role.

Despite not winning that major role, Davenport impressed studio head Samuel Goldwyn. In 1940, he gave a lead role to Davenport in the film The Westerner, starring opposite Gary Cooper and Walter Brennan. The same year, she starred in the movie Behind the News opposite Lloyd Nolan. It was her last role. With no other offers following that film, she retired from acting.

Personal life and death 
When she worked as a model, Davenport met photographer V. G. Weaver, Jr., and they soon married.

She settled in Santa Cruz, California, where she lived until her death on June 18, 1980, age 63.

Filmography

References

External links

 
 

20th-century American actresses
Actresses from Illinois
American film actresses
People from Moline, Illinois
Actresses from Los Angeles County, California
Actresses from Santa Cruz, California
1917 births
1980 deaths